Henrieta Nagyová was the defending champion, but decided to play in the Sparkassen Cup instead.

Angelique Widjaja won the title in her first WTA tournament she was playing in, becoming the lowest ranked player ever to win a WTA title.

Draw

Seeds

  Arantxa Sánchez Vicario (semifinals)
  Tamarine Tanasugarn (quarterfinals)
  Marlene Weingärtner (first round)
  Meilen Tu (withdrew)
  Rita Grande (quarterfinals)
  Mariana Díaz Oliva (first round)
  Rossana de los Ríos (first round)
  Joannette Kruger (final)

Final

Section 1

Section 2

References

2001 in Indonesian tennis
Sport in Bali
2001 Women's Singles
Wismilak International - Singles